"New York City Boy" is a song by English synth-pop duo Pet Shop Boys, released on 27 September 1999 as the second single from their seventh studio album, Nightlife (1999). In the UK, the single peaked at number 14 on the UK Singles Chart. It also reached the charts in numerous European countries, peaking at number three in Spain, and number four in Finland and Hungary. In the US, the song hit number one on the Billboard Hot Dance Club Play chart and number 53 on the Billboard Hot Singles Sales chart.

The second B-side, "Casting a Shadow", was written for BBC Radio 1 during the 11 August 1999 solar eclipse, and CD 2 featured a bonus video showing the song alongside footage of the eclipse in the UK.

This song has many references inside, particularly two famous disco culture songs. The first one is in the string arrangements, reference to "It's good for the soul" by The Salsoul Orchestra (1976). It's not surprising because in the strings and arrangements is the leader of that band, Vincent Montana Jr. The second one is the sample of the Giorgio Moroder & Donna Summer song "Mac Arthur Park" (1978).

Critical reception
Pop Rescue commented, "Disco comes unashamedly bursting in, with second single New York City Boy, a kind of early Your Disco Needs You, complete with camp video and men’s choruses throughout. The pace is fast, and I can imagine that this song attracted mixes by the bucketload."

Music video
The music video for the song features the New York nightspot Studio 54 and was directed by British director Howard Greenhalgh.

Track listings

UK CD single 1 (CDRS 6525)
 "New York City Boy" (radio edit)
 "The Ghost of Myself"
 "New York City Boy" (The Almighty Definitive Mix)
 "New York City Boy" (music video)

UK CD single 2 (CDR 6525)
 "New York City Boy" (album version)
 "Casting a Shadow"
 "New York City Boy" (Superchumbo's Uptown Mix)
 "Casting a Shadow" (enhanced eclipse video footage)

UK cassette single (TCR 6525)
 "New York City Boy" (radio edit)
 "The Ghost of Myself"
 "New York City Boy" (The Almighty Definitive Mix)

UK remixes double vinyl (12R 6525)
 "New York City Boy" (The Morales club mix)
 "New York City Boy" (The Almighty man on a mission mix)
 "New York City Boy" (The Lange mix)
 "New York City Boy" (The Thunderpuss 2000 club mix)
 "New York City Boy" (The Superchumbo downtown dub)

US CD single (35013-2)
 "New York City Boy" (radio edit)
 "New York City Boy" (The Superchumbo uptown mix)
 "New York City Boy" (The Superchumbo downtown dub)
 "New York City Boy" (The Almighty definitive mix)
 "New York City Boy" (The Almighty man on a mission mix)
 "New York City Boy" (The Thunderpuss 2000 club mix)
 "New York City Boy" (The Thunderdub)
 "New York City Boy" (The Morales club mix)
 "New York City Boy" (The Lange mix)

Personnel
According to "Nightlife: Further Listening 1996 - 2000", 2017:
 Conductor and vocal arranger: Danny Madden
 Arranger and conductor strings and horns: Vincent Montana, Jr.
 Backing vocals: Billy Cliff, John James, Keith Fluitt and Steve Abram
 Bass guitar: Gene Perez
 Engineers: Steve Barkan, Bill Importico, Jr., Jon Smelz.
 Mixing engineer: Goetz Botzenhardt
 Percussion: Carlos Gomez
 Keyboards, vocals: Chris Lowe
 Producer: David Morales
 Keyboards and Programmer: Joey Mosk
 Vocals: Neil Tennant
 Mixing engineer: Pet Shop Boys
 Remastering engineer: Tim Young

Charts

Weekly charts

Year-end charts

References

1999 singles
1999 songs
English house music songs
Music videos directed by Howard Greenhalgh
Nu-disco songs
Parlophone singles
Pet Shop Boys songs
Songs about New York City
Songs written by Chris Lowe
Songs written by Neil Tennant